Mariya Mikhailyuk (born 29 January 1991) is a Russian sprinter. She competed in the 400 metres event at the 2015 World Championships in Athletics in Beijing, China.

References

External links

1991 births
Living people
Russian female sprinters
World Athletics Championships athletes for Russia
Place of birth missing (living people)